Zhu Ting (born 15 July 1985 in Dalian, Liaoning) is a professional Chinese footballer who plays as right-back, right winger or forward for Dalian Professional.

Club career
Starting his football career with Dalian Shide in 2002, Zhu Ting was unable to play in any league games and he was given the chance to start his professional career with second tier side Dalian Changbo on a loan move in 2004 where in his first season he played seventeen games and scored one goal. Moving back to Dalian the following season, he was given the chance to prove himself by then manager Vladimir Petrović and despite only playing in a handful of games he would still be part of the squad that won the league and cup double at the end of the season. 

The next season saw him go on to establish himself as the team's regular striker, however despite not being a prolific scorer, he won praise for his speed, determination and high work rate until the end of the 2008 league season when Dalian struggled within the league and there were question marks with his future even in July 2009, Dalian was rumoured to have accepted a deal from Prva HNL side Hadjuk Split to loan Zhu for a fee of €120,000 with a view for a permanent deal in the future. The deal never materialized and Zhu had to fight for his place within the squad once again.

After failing to establish himself as a striker in the club, Zhu made a position transition to right winger and later to right-back by manager Nelo Vingada during the 2011 league season. He had an outstanding performances in the new position and eventually returned to the Chinese national team as defender in August 2012. Zhu transferred to promoted Chinese Super League side Wuhan Zall after Dalian dissolved at the end of the 2012 season.

On 12 February 2015, Zhu transferred to China League One side Dalian Aerbin (now renamed Dalian Professional). He immediately established himself as a vital member of their team that eventually went on to win the division title and promotion to the top tier at the end of the 2017 China League One campaign. The following campaign he was able to help ensure the club remained within the league. By the 2020 league campaign, the introduction of Tong Lei saw Zhu  excluded from the first team squad of Dalian Professional. 

He left the team in 2021, to join fellow top tier club Qingdao F.C. While he established himself as a vital member of their team, he would be part of the squad that was relegated at the end of the 2021 Chinese Super League season. The relegation would see the club dissolved and Zhu would return to his former club Dalian Pro.

International career
Zhu made his international debut on 11 October 2006 in a 2007 AFC Asian Cup qualification game against Palestine in a 2–0 victory and would soon be included into the Chinese squad for the 2007 AFC Asian Cup. He was eligible to play for the 2008 Summer Olympics squad where he started the final group game of the tournament. He returned to the national team in 2008 when he participated in several matches during 2010 FIFA World Cup qualification.

Career statistics
.

Honours

Club
Dalian Shide
Chinese Super League: 2005.
Chinese FA Cup: 2005.

Dalian Professional
China League One: 2017.

References

External links
Player Profile at Sina.com
Player stats at Football-lineups.com

 
Player stats at Sohu.com

1985 births
Living people
Association football forwards
Chinese footballers
Footballers from Dalian
China international footballers
2007 AFC Asian Cup players
Footballers at the 2008 Summer Olympics
Olympic footballers of China
Dalian Shide F.C. players
Wuhan F.C. players
Dalian Professional F.C. players
Chinese Super League players
China League One players
Footballers at the 2006 Asian Games
Asian Games competitors for China